Bobcat Hills may refer to the following landforms:

 Bobcat Hills (Greenlee County, Arizona) 
 Bobcat Hills (Upton County, Texas) 
 Bobcat Hills (San Bernardino County, California)